Cynthia Haseloff (born 1948) is an American author of western novels.

Haseloff was born in Vernon, Texas. She is a part of the Western Writers of America and used to be a board member of Shiloh Museum and the Washington County Historical Society. Her western novel The Kiowa Verdict won the Spur Award for Best Western Novel.

Bibliography
Ride South! (1980)
A Killer Comes To Shiloh (1981)
Marauder (1982)
Badman (1983)
The Chains of Sarai Stone (1995)
Man Without Medicine (1996)
The Kiowa Verdict (1997)
Dead Woman's Trail (1998)
Satanta's Woman (1998)
Changing Trains (2001)

References

1948 births
American women novelists
American Western (genre) novelists
Living people
21st-century American women